Lojunk-e Sofla (also Romanized as Lojūnk-e Soflá; also known as Lojeng-e Soflá, Lajnak, Lojeng-e Pā’īn, Lojong Pā’īn, and Lūjung) is a village in Doreh Rural District, in the Central District of Sarbisheh County, South Khorasan Province, Iran. At the 2006 census, its population was 158, in 32 families.

References 

Populated places in Sarbisheh County